Steen Rasmussen (born 1 December 1888, date of death unknown) was a Danish athlete. He competed in the men's individual cross country event at the 1912 Summer Olympics.

References

External links
 

1888 births
Year of death missing
Athletes (track and field) at the 1912 Summer Olympics
Danish male long-distance runners
Olympic athletes of Denmark
People from Randers
Olympic cross country runners
Sportspeople from the Central Denmark Region